Hittmair may refer to:

 Otto Hittmair (1924–2003), an Austrian theoretical physicist 
 10782 Hittmair, a minor planetoid named after physicist Otto Hittmair